Brusasco is an Italian surname. Notable people with the surname include:

Ian Brusasco (1928–2021), Australian businessman
Mark Brusasco (born 1960), Australian former association football player

Italian-language surnames